This is a record of notable programming languages, by decade.

Pre-1950

1950s

1960s

1970s

1980s

1990s

2000s

2010s

2020s

See also
 History of computing hardware
 History of programming languages
 Programming language
 Timeline of computing

References

External links
 Online Historical Encyclopaedia of Programming Languages
 Diagram & history of programming languages
 Eric Levenez's timeline diagram of computer languages history

Programming
Lists of programming languages
History of computer science